
Gmina Kotlin is a rural gmina (administrative district) in Jarocin County, Greater Poland Voivodeship, in west-central Poland.

Villages
Gmina Kotlin contains the villages and settlements of Kotlin, Kurcew, Magnuszewice, Orpiszewek, Parzew, Racendów, Sławoszew, Twardów, Wilcza, Wola Książęca, Wysogotówek and Wyszki.

Neighbouring gminas
Gmina Kotlin is bordered by the gminas of Czermin, Dobrzyca, Jarocin, Pleszew and Żerków.

References
Polish official population figures 2006

Kotlin
Jarocin County